Alexander Majors (October 4, 1814 – January 13, 1900) was an American businessman, who along with William Hepburn Russell and William B. Waddell founded the Pony Express, based in St. Joseph, Missouri. This was one of the westernmost points east of the Missouri River from its upper portion beyond that state. It was a major supply point for migrants and pioneers headed west to Oregon Country.

In about 1860, their freight firm, now known as "Russell, Majors and Waddell," formed the Central Overland California and Pikes Peak Express Company to get the federal contract to deliver mail between Missouri and California. The contract had previously been held by Butterfield Overland Mail, which delivered the mail in 25 days or more over a route that went through the South. With sectional tensions on the rise, Majors and his colleagues proposed to deliver the mail over a central route through Salt Lake City, Utah and proposed doing it in 10 days, via a horse relay they called the Pony Express.

Even though they succeeded in making the deliveries, they did not get the contract. They went bankrupt after the Transcontinental Telegraph opened in October 1861, as its competition eliminated the need for some mail service.

Majors supplied rail ties for the crews of the Union Pacific Railroad working on the First transcontinental railroad. After the railroad was completed, he continued to haul freight to towns not yet served by the railroad.

Early life and education
Alexander Majors was born October 4 in the year 1814, in Franklin, Kentucky.

Overland freight

In 1848 Alexander Majors started hauling overland freight on the Santa Fe Trail. On his first trip, he set a new time record of 92 days for the 1564-mile (2500 km) round trip. Eventually he employed 4,000 men, including a 15-year-old lad named Billy Cody, later known as Buffalo Bill. Cody became one of his most famous Pony Express riders.

in 1853 Majors was awarded federal contracts to haul supplies to United States Army posts along the Santa Fe Trail. Majors helped establish the Kansas City, Missouri stockyards. This became a center of marketing and shipping beef from Texas and the Southwest by railroad to the East Coast and Midwest.

In 1854 he teamed up with William B. Waddell and William Hepburn Russell. Majors was responsible for the freighting part of the business, Waddell was to manage the office, and Russell was to use his Washington DC contacts to acquire new contracts. Waddell chose be a silent partner, so the firm was initially called "Majors and Russell". In the 1850s their firm Russell, Majors and Waddell and the short-lived Pony Express were major businesses, contributing to the growth of Kansas City.

Majors' Overland Stage Company was part of a wide network that reached into the frontier West. Fifteen years later, changes in transportation had put the company out of business.

On the Missouri side of State Line at 81st Street, Majors built a two-story frame farmhouse in 1855. (His house is now operated as a museum.) From there, wagon trains headed west loaded with goods from his warehouse located on the Missouri River. In Westport, Majors operated a meat-packing plant. It supplied the trains with cured pork, soap and candles. For 15 years Majors and his far-flung interests were highly successful.

In 1860 his Pony Express began. But by then, technology was already threatening. Telegraphs and railroads were being rapidly constructed across the continent. The telegraph made critical messages possible at speeds that could never be equalled by the Pony Express. Given its speed and carrying capacity, the "great iron horse" of railroad locomotives (and the cars they pulled) were finally too superior in the competition for freight and passengers against Majors' freighting and stage coach operations.

By 1865 Majors sold out what little remained of his business and moved to Colorado. Thirty years later, his former young wagonmaster and Pony Express rider, William F. "Buffalo Bill" Cody, found him. He was old, ill and penniless. Cody helped him, taking Majors on as part of the Cody Wild West show. Majors lived at Cody's Scouts' Rest Ranch in North Platte, Nebraska for a time.

Majors died in Chicago, Illinois, on January 13, 1900, aged 85. He is buried in Union Cemetery in Kansas City, Missouri.

See also
Pony Express
Postage stamps and postal history of the United States
Pony Express Bible
SS Alexander Majors

References

External links
 
 
"Life of Alexander Majors in Kansas City", Alexander Majors Chapter, Sons of the American Revolution, at GeoCities (Archived 2009-10-25)
"Alexander Majors", Over Land

1814 births
1900 deaths
Businesspeople from Kansas City, Missouri
People from Colorado
Pony Express
19th-century American businesspeople